Non-interventionism or non-intervention is a political philosophy or  national foreign policy doctrine that opposes interference in the domestic politics and affairs of other countries but, in contrast to isolationism, is not necessarily opposed to international commitments in general. A 1915 definition is that non-interventionism is a policy characterized by the absence of "interference by a state or states in the external affairs of another state without its consent, or in its internal affairs with or without its consent".

This is based on the grounds that a state should not interfere in the internal politics of another state as well as the principles of state sovereignty and self-determination. A similar phrase is "strategic independence".

History

The norm of non-intervention has dominated the majority of international relations and can be seen to have been one of the principal motivations for the US's initial non-intervention into World Wars I and II, and the non-intervention of the liberal powers in the Spanish Civil War, despite the intervention of Germany and Italy. The norm was then firmly established into international law as one of central tenets of the United Nations Charter, which established non-intervention as one of the key principles which would underpin the emergent post-World War II peace.

However, this was soon affected by the advent of the Cold War, which increased the number and intensity of interventions in the domestic politics of a vast number of developing countries under pretexts such as instigating a "global socialist revolution" or ensuring "containment" of such a revolution. The adoption of such pretexts and the idea that such interventions were to prevent a threat to "international peace and security" allowed intervention under Chapter VII of the UN Charter. Additionally, the UN's power to regulate such interventions was hampered during the Cold War due to both the US and USSR holding veto power in the United Nations Security Council.

In different country

China

Mutual non-interference has been one of China's principles on foreign policy since 1954. After Chinese economic reform, China began to focus on industrial development and so actively avoided military conflict over the subsequent decades. As of December 2018, China has used its veto eleven times in UN Security Council. China first used the veto on 25 August 1972 to block Bangladesh's admission to the United Nations. From 1971 to 2011, China used its veto sparingly, preferring to abstain rather than veto resolutions not directly related to Chinese interests. China turned abstention into an "art form," abstaining on 30% of Security Council Resolutions between 1971 and 1976.

Sweden

Sweden has remained non-interventionist since the backlash against the king following Swedish losses in the Napoleonic Wars; the coup d'etat that followed in 1812 caused Jean Baptiste Bernadotte to establish a policy of non-intervention, which has remained since the end of the Napoleonic Wars in 1815.

Switzerland

Switzerland has long been known for its policy of defensively armed neutrality.

United States

In December 2013, the Pew Research Center reported that their newest poll, "American's Place in the World 2013," had revealed that 52 percent of respondents in the national poll said that the United States "should mind its own business internationally and let other countries get along the best they can on their own." That was the most people to answer that question this way in the history of the question, which pollsters began asking in 1964. Only about a third of respondents felt that way a decade earlier.

Decline

Since the end of the Cold War, new emergent norms of humanitarian intervention are challenging the norm of non-intervention, based upon the argument that while sovereignty gives rights to states, there is also a responsibility to protect its citizens. The ideal, an argument based upon social contract theory, has states being justified in intervening within other states if the latter fail to protect (or are actively involved in harming) their citizens.

That idea has been used to justify the UN-sanctioned intervention Operation Provide Comfort in Northern Iraq in 1991 to protect the Kurds and in Somalia, UNOSOM I and UNOSOM II from 1992 to 1995 in the absence of state power. However, after the US "Black Hawk Down" event in 1993 in Mogadishu, the US refused to intervene in Rwanda or Haiti. However, despite strong opposition from Russia and China, the idea of the responsibility to protect was again used to justify NATO intervention in Kosovo in 1999 and the 2011 military intervention in Libya.

The new norm of humanitarian intervention is not universally accepted and is often seen as still developing.

See also

 Interventionism
 Isolationism
 Neutral country
 A Few Words on Non-Intervention by John Stuart Mill
 International relations theory
 Prime Directive, a non-interventionist principle in the fictional Star Trek universe
 List of anti-war organizations
 List of countries without armed forces
 List of peace activists

References

Bibliography
 Kupchan, Charles A. (2020) Isolationism: A History of America's Efforts to Shield Itself from the World (Oxford University Press, 2020).

 Wheeler, N.J. (2003) "The Humanitarian Responsibilities of Sovereignty: Explaining the Development of a New Norm of Military Intervention for Humanitarian Purposes in International Society" in Welsh, J.M. Humanitarian Intervention and International Relations Oxford: Oxford Scholarship Online, pp. 29–50.
 Walzer, M.J. (2000) Just and Unjust Wars New York: Basic Books, pp. 86–108.

External links

 
 

 
International law
International relations theory
Libertarian theory
Paleolibertarianism
Political theories